David Lappartient  (born 31 May 1973) is a French politician, sporting administrator and the president of the Union Cycliste Internationale (UCI), having been elected to the post in September 2017 at the 2017 UCI Road World Championships. In February 2022 he was elected to serve an eight year term as a member of the International Olympic Committee.

References

Living people
People from Pontivy
Presidents of UCI
1973 births
International Olympic Committee members